Bruzaholm is a locality situated in Eksjö Municipality, Jönköping County, Sweden with 250 inhabitants in 2010. It is one of only two inhabited localities in Sweden whose name contain the letter z; the name comes from "Brusan", a name for a nearby river, and the suffix "-holm". It has been spelled in several ways from the 18th century to the early 20th, including "Brysaholm" and "Brusaholm".

References

External links 

Populated places in Jönköping County
Populated places in Eksjö Municipality